Chinna Ninna Muddaduve is a 1977 Indian Kannada film written by Salil Chowdhury, with a screenplay by and produced, directed by A. M. Sameeulla. The film stars Vishnuvardhan and Jayanthi, with supporting actors Ambareesh, Pramila Joshoy, and Baby Indira. The movie was remade in the same year in Hindi as Minoo.

Plot

Cast

 Vishnuvardhan
 Jayanthi
 Ambareesh
 Pramila Joshoy
 Baby Indira
 M.N. Lakshmi Devi

Soundtrack
 Naane raja naane rani, lyrics: Uday Shankar, singers: Sow Mitri, L. R. Anjali
 Dehakke usire, lyrics: R. N. Jayagopal, singers: S. P. Badasab, Anita Chowdhury
 Jo jo lali, lyrics: R. N. Jayagopal, singers: Jesudas, S. Janaki, Anita Chowdhury

References

External links
 Chinna Ninna Muddaduve at the Internet Movie Database

1977 films
1970s Kannada-language films
Films scored by Salil Chowdhury
Kannada films remade in other languages